The 2019 BSL All-Star Game, officially called the 2019 Tahincioğlu All-Star Game for sponsorship reasons, was held on January 20, 2019, at the Sinan Erdem Dome, Istanbul.

All-Star Game

Coaches 
Ergin Ataman of Anadolu Efes was named as the head coach for the Team Europe and Burak Gören of Türk Telekom was named as the head coach for the Team Asia.

Rosters 
Two teams, Team Europe and Team Asia, competed in the event. Team Europe consisted of players from the teams based in the European side, and Team Asia consisted of players from the teams based in the Asian side of Turkey.

The startes for the All-Star Game were selected through a voting process. The reserves were selected by the head coaches.

Game

All-Star Organizations

Celebrity Game
The Celebrity Game was a 3x3 basketball game, with one backboard and in a half-court setup.

Skills Challenge
The Skills Challenge was presented by LeasePlan.

Three-Point Contest 
The Three-Point Contest was presented by ING Bank.

Slam Dunk Contest 
The Slam Dunk Contest was presented by Tahincioğlu. The judges were David Rivers, Efe Aydan, Melissa Tahincioğlu, Alain Digbeu and Tamer Oyguç.

 Onuralp Bitim was unable to play due to disease.
 Zach Auguste was selected as Onuralp Bitim's replacement.

References

All-Star
Basketbol Süper Ligi All-Star Game